Smila Raion was raion in Cherkasy Oblast. Its administrative centre was located at the town of Smila which was incorporated separately as a city of oblast significance and did not belong to the raion. The raion was abolished on 18 July 2020 as part of the administrative reform of Ukraine, which reduced the number of raions of Cherkasy Oblast to four. The area of Smila Raion was merged into Cherkasy Raion. The last estimate of the raion population was: 

At the time of disestablishment, the raion consisted of four hromadas:
 Balakleia rural hromada with the administration in the selo of Balakleia;
 Berezniaky rural hromada with the administration in the selo of Berezniaky;
 Rotmistrivka rural hromada with the administration in the selo of Rotmistrivka;
 Ternivka rural hromada with the administration in the selo of Ternivka.

People

From Smila Raion 
 Todos' Os'machka - a Ukrainian poet

Associated 
 Élie Metchnikoff

References

Former raions of Cherkasy Oblast
1923 establishments in Ukraine
Ukrainian raions abolished during the 2020 administrative reform